Asura alikangiae is a moth in the family Erebidae first described by Embrik Strand in 1917. It is found in Taiwan.

The wingspan is 20–28 mm. Adults are on wing from March to June.

References

Moths described in 1917
alikangiae
Moths of Taiwan